Nairobi is the capital and largest city of Kenya. The name is derived from the Maasai phrase Enkare Nairobi, which translates to "place of cool waters", a reference to the Nairobi River which flows through the city. The city proper had a population of 4,397,073 in the 2019 census, while the metropolitan area has a projected population in 2022 of 10.8 million. The city is commonly referred to as The Green City in the Sun.

Nairobi was founded in 1899 by colonial authorities in British East Africa, as a rail depot on the Uganda - Kenya Railway. The town quickly grew to replace Mombasa as the capital of Kenya in 1907. After independence in 1963, Nairobi became the capital of the Republic of Kenya. During Kenya's colonial period, the city became a centre for the colony's coffee, tea and sisal industry.

Nairobi is home of the Kenyan Parliament Buildings and hosts thousands of Kenyan businesses and over 1000 major international companies and organizations, including the United Nations Environment Programme (UN Environment) and the United Nations Office at Nairobi (UNON). Nairobi is an established hub for business and culture. The Nairobi Securities Exchange (NSE) is one of the largest in Africa and the second-oldest exchange on the continent. It is Africa's fourth-largest exchange in terms of trading volume, capable of making 10 million trades a day. It also contains the Nairobi National Park. Nairobi joined the UNESCO Global Network of Learning Cities in 2010.

History

Early years

The site of Nairobi was originally part of an uninhabited swamp. The name Nairobi itself comes from the Maasai expression meaning "cool waters", referring to the cold water stream which flowed through the area. With the arrival of the Uganda Railway, the site was identified by Sir George Whitehouse for a store depot, shunting ground and camping ground for the Indian labourers working on the railway. Whitehouse, chief engineer of the railway, favoured the site as an ideal resting place due to its high elevation, temperate climate, adequate water supply and being situated before the steep ascent of the Limuru escarpments. His choice was however criticised by officials within the Protectorate government who felt the site was too flat, poorly drained and relatively infertile.
 During the pre-colonial era, the people of modern Kenya mostly lived in villages amongst their tribes and cultural groups, where they had rulers within their communities rather than one singular government or leader.

In 1898, Arthur Church was commissioned to design the first town layout for the railway depot. It constituted two streets – Victoria Street and Station Street, ten avenues, staff quarters and an Indian commercial area. The railway arrived at Nairobi on 30 May 1899, and soon Nairobi replaced Machakos as the headquarters of the provincial administration for Ukamba province. On the arrival of the railway, Whitehouse remarked that "Nairobi itself will in the course of the next two years become a large and flourishing place and already there are many applications for sites for hotels, shops and houses. The town's early years were however beset with problems of malaria leading to at least one attempt to have the town moved. In the early 1900s, Bazaar Street (now Biashara Street) was completely rebuilt after an outbreak of plague and the burning of the original town.

Between 1902 and 1910, the town's population rose from 5,000 to 16,000 and grew around administration and tourism, initially in the form of big game hunting. In 1907, Nairobi replaced Mombasa as the capital of the East Africa Protectorate. In 1908, a further outbreak of the plague led to Europeans concluding that the cause was unhygienic conditions in the Indian Bazaar. The government responded by restricting lower class Indians and African natives to specific quarters for residence and trade setting a precedent for racial segregation in the commercial sphere. By the outset of the First World War, Nairobi was well established as a European settler colony through immigration and land alienation. In 1919, Nairobi was declared to be a municipality.

Growth
In 1921, Nairobi had 24,000 residents, of which 12,000 were native Africans. The next decade saw growth in native African communities in Nairobi, and they began to constitute a majority for the first time. This growth caused planning issues, described by Thorntorn White and his planning team as the "Nairobi Problem". In February 1926, colonial officer Eric Dutton passed through Nairobi on his way to Mount Kenya, and said of the city:

After World War II, continuous expansion of the city angered both the indigenous Maasai and Kikuyu. This led to the Mau Mau Uprising in the 1950s, and the Lancaster House Conferences, which initiated a transition to Kenyan independence in 1963.

In the spring of 1950, the East African Trades Union Congress (EAUTC) led a nine-day general strike in the city.

Post independence

Nairobi remained capital of Kenya after independence, and its continued rapid growth put pressure on the city's infrastructure. Power cuts and water shortages were a common occurrence.

On 11 September 1973, the Kenyatta International Conference Centre KICC was open to the public. The 28-storey building at the time was designed by the Norwegian architect Karl Henrik Nøstvik and Kenyan David Mutiso. It is the only building within the city with a helipad that is open to the public. Of the buildings built in the Seventies, the KICC was the most eco-friendly and most environmentally conscious structure; its main frame was constructed with locally available materials gravel, sand, cement and wood, and it had wide open spaces which allowed for natural aeration and natural lighting. Cuboids made up the plenary hall, the tower consisted of a cylinder composed of several cuboids, and the amphitheater and helipad both resembled cones. The tower was built around a concrete core and it had no walls but glass windows, which allowed for maximum natural lighting. It had the largest halls in eastern and central Africa.

A years prior in 1972, the World Bank approved funds for further expansion of the then Nairobi Airport (now Jomo Kenyatta International Airport), including a new international and domestic passenger terminal building, the airport's first dedicated cargo and freight terminal, new taxiways, associated aprons, internal roads, car parks, police and fire stations, a State Pavilion, airfield and roadway lighting, fire hydrant system, water, electrical, telecommunications and sewage systems, a dual carriageway passenger access road, security, drainage and the building of the main access road to the airport (Airport South Road). The total cost of the project was more than US$29 million (US$111.8 million in 2013 dollars). On 14 March 1978, construction of the terminal building was completed on the other side of the airport's single runway and opened by President Jomo Kenyatta less than five months before his death. The airport was renamed Jomo Kenyatta International Airport in memory of its first president.

The United States Embassy, then located in downtown Nairobi, was bombed in August 1998 by Al-Qaeda and the Egyptian Islamic Jihad, as one of a series of US embassy bombings. It is now the site of a memorial park.

21st century

On 9 November 2012, President Mwai Kibaki opened the KES 31 billion Thika Superhighway. This mega-project of Kenya started in 2009 and ended in 2011. It involved expanding the four-lane carriageway to eight lanes, building underpasses, providing interchanges at roundabouts, erecting flyovers and building underpasses to ease congestion. The 50.4-kilometre road was built in three phases: Uhuru Highway to Muthaiga Roundabout; Muthaiga Roundabout to Kenyatta University and; Kenyatta University to Thika Town.

On 31 May 2017, President Uhuru Kenyatta inaugurated the Standard Gauge Railway which runs from Nairobi to Mombasa and vice versa. It was primarily built by a Chinese firm with about 90% of total funding from China and about 10% from the Kenyan government. A second phase is also being built which will link Naivasha to the existing route and also the Uganda border.

On 11 August 2020, Nairobi County Assembly Speaker Beatrice Elachi resigned. On 21 December 2020, recently elected Nairobi County Assembly Speaker Benson Mutura was sworn in as acting Nairobi Governor four days after the previous Nairobi Governor Mike Sonko was impeached and removed from office. At the time of Mutura's swearing in as acting Governor, which he will hold for at least 60 days, Nairobi did not have a Deputy Governor as well.

Historical population data for Nairobi

Geography

Nairobi is situated between the cities of Kampala and Mombasa. As Nairobi is adjacent to the eastern edge of the Rift Valley, minor earthquakes and tremors occasionally occur. The Ngong Hills, located to the west of the city, are the most prominent geographical feature of the Nairobi area. Mount Kenya is situated north of Nairobi, and Mount Kilimanjaro is towards the south-east.

The Nairobi River and its tributaries traverse through the Nairobi County and joins the larger River Athi on the eastern edge of the county. 

Nobel Peace Prize laureate Wangari Maathai fought fiercely to save the indigenous Karura Forest in northern Nairobi which was under threat of being replaced by housing and other infrastructure.

The city is centred on the City Square, which is located in the Central Business District. The Kenyan Parliament buildings, the Holy Family Cathedral, Nairobi City Hall, Nairobi Law Courts, and the Kenyatta Conference Centre all surround the square.

Climate
Under the Köppen climate classification, Nairobi has a subtropical highland climate (Cwb). The sunniest and warmest part of the year is from December to March, when temperatures average in the high-twenties Celsius during the day.

There are rainy seasons, but rainfall can be moderate. The cloudiest part of the year is just after the first rainy season, when, until September, conditions are usually overcast with drizzle. As Nairobi is situated close to the equator, the differences between the seasons are minimal. The seasons are referred to as the wet season and dry season. The timing of sunrise and sunset varies little throughout the year for the same reason.

Districts and neighbourhoods

Nairobi is divided into a series of constituencies with each being represented by members of Parliament in the National Assembly. The initial constituencies before the 2010 constitution which led to the county electoral boundaries benig redrawn were: Makadara, Kamukunji, Starehe, Langata, Dagoretti, Westlands, Kasarani, and Embakasi. The new electoral boundaries after this were revised to Embakasi North, Embakasi South, Embakasi Central, Embakasi East, Embakasi West, Makadara, Kamukunji, Starehe, Mathare, Westlands, Dagoretti North, Dagoretti South, Langata, Kibra, Ruaraka, Roysambu and Kasarani. The main administrative divisions of Nairobi are Central, Dagoretti, Embakasi, Kasarani, Kibera, Makadara, Pumwani, and Westlands. Most of the upmarket suburbs are situated to the west and north-central of Nairobi, where most European settlers resided during the colonial times AKA 'Ubabini'. These include Karen, Langata, Lavington, Gigiri, Muthaiga, Brookside, Spring Valley, Loresho, Kilimani, Kileleshwa, Hurlingham, Runda, Kitisuru, Nyari, Kyuna, Lower Kabete, Westlands, and Highridge, although Kangemi, Kawangware, and Dagoretti are lower income areas close to these affluent suburbs. The city's colonial past is commemorated by many English place-names.

Most lower-middle and upper middle income neighbourhoods are located in the north-central areas such as Highridge, Parklands, Ngara, Pangani, and areas to the southwest and southeast of the metropolitan area near the Jomo Kenyatta International Airport. The most notable ones include Avenue Park, Fedha, Pipeline, Donholm, Greenfields, Nyayo, Taasia, Baraka, Nairobi West, Madaraka, Siwaka, South B, South C, Mugoya, Riverbank, Hazina, Buru Buru, Uhuru, Harambee Civil Servants', Akiba, Kimathi, Pioneer, and Koma Rock to the centre-east and Kasarani to northeast area among others. The low and lower income estates are located mainly in far eastern Nairobi. These include, Umoja, Kariokor, Dandora, Kariobangi, Kayole, Ruai, Kamulu, Embakasi, and Huruma. Kitengela suburb, though located further southeast, Ongata Rongai and Kiserian further southwest, and Ngong/Embulbul suburbs also known as 'Diaspora' to the far west are considered part of the Greater Nairobi Metropolitan area. More than 90% of Nairobi residents work within the Nairobi Metropolitan area, in the formal and informal sectors. Many Somali immigrants have also settled in Eastleigh, nicknamed "Little Mogadishu". Here's the list of all postal codes for Nairobi.

Kibera slum

The Kibera slum in Nairobi is claimed by the Kenyan government to have a population of 185,777. However, non-governmental sources generally estimate the slum to have a population of 500,000 to 1,000,000, depending on what areas are defined as comprising Kibera.

Parks and gardens

Nairobi has many parks and open spaces throughout the city. Much of the city has dense tree-cover and plenty of green spaces. The most famous park in Nairobi is Uhuru Park. The park borders the central business district and the neighbourhood Upper Hill. Uhuru (Freedom in Swahili) Park is a centre for outdoor speeches, services, and rallies. The park was to be built over by former President Daniel arap Moi, who wanted the 62-storey headquarters of his party, the Kenya African National Union, situated in the park. However, the park was saved following a campaign by Nobel Peace Prize winner Wangari Maathai.

Central Park is adjacent to Uhuru Park, and includes a memorial for Jomo Kenyatta, the first president of Kenya, and the Moi Monument, built in 1988 to commemorate the second president's first decade in power. Other notable open spaces include Jeevanjee Gardens, City Park, 7 August Memorial Park, and Nairobi Arboretum.

The colonial 1948 Master Plan for Nairobi still acts as the governing mechanism when it comes to making decisions related to urban planning. The Master Plan at the time, which was designed for 250,000 people, allocated 28% of Nairobi's land to public space, but because of rapid population growth, much of the vitality of public spaces within the city are increasingly threatened.

Political divisions

The City of Nairobi enjoys the status of a full administrative County.

The Nairobi province differs in several ways from other Kenyan regions. The county is entirely urban. It has only one local council, Nairobi City Council. Nairobi Province was not divided into "districts" until 2007, when three districts were created. In 2010, along with the new constitution, Nairobi was renamed a county and consolidated into a city-county

Nairobi County has 17 constituencies. Constituency name may differ from division name, such that Starehe Constituency is equal to Central Division, Lang'ata Constituency to Kibera division, and Kamukunji Constituency to Pumwani Division in terms of boundaries.

Constituencies

Nairobi is divided into 17 constituencies and 85 wards, mostly named after residential estates. Kibera Division, for example, includes Kibera (Kenya's largest slum) as well as affluent estates of Karen and Langata.

The Nairobi Postal code is 00100

Economy

Nairobi is home to the Nairobi Securities Exchange (NSE), one of Africa's largest stock exchanges. The NSE was officially recognised as an overseas stock exchange by the London Stock Exchange in 1953. The exchange is Africa's fourth largest in terms of trading volumes, and fifth largest in terms of Market Capitalization as a percentage of GDP.

Nairobi is the regional headquarters of several international companies and organisations. In 2007, General Electric, Young & Rubicam, Google, Coca-Cola, IBM Services, and Cisco Systems relocated their African headquarters to the city. The United Nations Office at Nairobi hosts UN Environment and UN-Habitat headquarters.

Several of Africa's largest companies are headquartered in Nairobi. Safaricom, the largest company in Kenya by assets and profitability is headquartered in Nairobi, KenGen, which is the largest African stock outside South Africa, is based in the city. Kenya Airways, Africa's fourth largest airline, uses Nairobi's Jomo Kenyatta International Airport as a hub.

Nairobi has not been left behind by the FinTech phenomenon that has taken over worldwide. It has produced a couple of tech firms like Craft Silicon, Kangai Technologies, Jambo Pay  and Hostraha Limited. which have been in the forefront of technology, innovation and cloud based computing services. Their products are widely used and have considerable market share presence within Kenya and outside its borders.

Goods manufactured in Nairobi include clothing, textiles, building materials, processed foods, beverages, and cigarettes. Several foreign companies have factories based in and around the city. These include Goodyear, General Motors, Toyota Motors, and Coca-Cola.

Nairobi has a large tourist industry, being both a tourist destination and a transport hub.

Central business district and skyline

Nairobi has grown around its central business district. This takes a rectangular shape, around the Uhuru Highway, Haile Selassie Avenue, Moi Avenue, and University Way. It features many of Nairobi's important buildings, including the City Hall and Parliament Building. The city square is also located within the perimeter.

Most of the skyscrapers in this region are the headquarters of businesses and corporations, such as I&M and the Kenyatta International Conference Centre. The United States Embassy bombing took place in this district, prompting the building of a new embassy building in the suburbs.

In 2011, the city was considered to have about 4 million residents. A large beautification project took place in the Central Business District, as the city prepared to host the 2006 Afri-Cities summit. Iconic buildings such as the Kenyatta International Conference Centre had their exteriors cleaned and repainted.

Nairobi downtown area or central business district is bordered to the southwest by Uhuru Park and Central Park. The Mombasa to Kampala railway runs to the southeast of the district.

Upper Hill

Companies that have moved from the Central Business District to Upper Hill include Citibank, and in 2007 Coca-Cola began construction of their East and Central African headquarters in Upper Hill, cementing the district as the preferred location for office space in Nairobi. The largest office development in this area is UAP Tower, completed in 2015 and officially opened for business on 4 July 2016. It is a 33-storey tower 163 meters high. The World Bank and International Finance Corporation (part of the World Bank Group) are also located in Upper Hill at the Delta Center, Menegai Road. Earlier on, they were located in the Hill Park Building and CBA Building respectively (both also in Upper Hill), and prior to that in View Park towers in the Central Business District.

To accommodate the large demand for floor space in Nairobi, various commercial projects are being constructed. New business parks are being built in the city, including the flagship Nairobi Business Park.

Construction boom and real estate development projects

Nairobi is undergoing a construction boom. Major real estate projects and skyscrapers are coming up in the city. Among them are:The pinnacle twin towers which will tower at 314 m, Britam Tower (200 m), Avic International Africa headquarters (176 m), Prism tower (140 m), Pan Africa insurance towers, Pallazzo offices, and many other projects. Shopping malls are also being constructed like the recently completed Garden city Mall, Centum's Two rivers Mall, The Hub in Karen, Karen waterfront, Thika Greens, and the recently reconstructed Westgate Mall. High-class residential apartments for living are coming up like Le Mac towers, a residential tower in Westlands Nairobi with 23 floors. Avic International is also putting up a total of four residential apartments on Waiyaki way: a 28-level tower, two 24-level towers, and a 25-level tower. Hotel towers are also being erected in the city. Avic International is putting up a 30-level hotel tower of 141 m in the Westlands. The hotel tower will be operated by Marriot group. Jabavu limited is constructing a 35 floor hotel tower in Upper Hill which will be high over 140 metres in the city skyline. Arcon Group Africa has also announced plans to erect a skyscraper in Upper hill which will have 66 floors and tower over 290 metres, further cementing Upper hill as the preferred metropolis for multinational corporations launching their operations in the Kenyan capital.

Also see List of tallest buildings in Kenya

Demographics

Nairobi has experienced one of the highest growth rates of any city in Africa. Since its foundation in 1899, Nairobi has grown to become the second largest city in the African Great Lakes, despite being one of youngest cities in the region. The growth rate of Nairobi is 4.1% a year. It is estimated that Nairobi's population will reach 5 million in 2025.

These data fit remarkably closely (r^2 = 0.9994) to a logistic curve with t(0) = 1900, P(0)=8500, r = 0.059 and K = 8,000,000. This suggests a 2011 growth rate of 3.5% (the CIA estimate of 4.5% cited above would have been true in 2005). According to this curve, the population of the city will be below 4 million in 2015, and will reach 5 million in 2025.

Given this high population growth, owing itself both to urban migration and high birth rates, the economy has yet to catch up. Unemployment is estimated at 40% within the city, mainly in the high-density, low income areas of the city which can make them seem even denser than the higher-income neighbourhoods.

Parks 

Nairobi has numerous recreational green areas. The largest is the Nairobi National Park, located in the Southern side of the city. Other recreational arears and protected forests include Uhuru Park, Central Park, John Michuki Park, Nairobi Arboretum, City Park, Uhuru Gardens, Jeevanjee Gardens, Karura Forest, Ngong forest, and Ololua forest.

Culture 
Kenya National Theatre, and the Kenya National Archives. Art galleries in Nairobi include the Rahimtulla Museum of Modern Art (Ramoma), the Mizizi Arts Centre, and the Nairobi National Museum.
There is also the Karen Blixen Museum and the Nairobi National Museum. There is Kuona Art Center for visual artists in Nairobi.

By the mid twentieth century, many foreigners settled in Nairobi from other parts of the British Empire, primarily India and parts of (present-day) Pakistan. These immigrants were workers who arrived to construct the Kampala – Mombasa railway, settling in Nairobi after its completion, and also merchants from Gujarat. Nairobi also has established communities from Somalia and Sudan.

Nairobi has two informal nicknames. The first is "The Green City in the Sun", which is derived from the city's foliage and warm climate. The second is the "Safari Capital of the World", which is used due to Nairobi's prominence as a hub for safari tourism.

Literature and film

Kwani? is Kenya's first literary journal and was established by writers living in Nairobi. Nairobi's publishing houses have also produced the works of some of Kenya's authors, including Ngũgĩ wa Thiong'o and Meja Mwangi who were part of post-colonial writing.

Many film makers also practice their craft out of Nairobi. Film-making is still young in the country, but people like producer Njeri Karago and director Judy Kibinge are paving the way for others.

Perhaps the most famous book and film set in Nairobi is Out of Africa. The book was written by Karen Blixen, whose pseudonym was Isak Dinesen, and it is her account of living in Kenya. Karen Blixen lived in the Nairobi area from 1917 to 1931. The neighbourhood in which she lived, Karen, is named after her.

In 1985, Out of Africa was made into a film, directed by Sydney Pollack. The film won 28 awards, including seven Academy Awards. The popularity of the film prompted the opening of Nairobi's Karen Blixen Museum.

Nairobi is also the setting of many of the novels of Ngũgĩ wa Thiong'o, Kenya's foremost writer.

Nairobi has been the set of several other American and British films. The most recent of these was The Constant Gardener (2005), a large part of which was filmed in the city. The story revolves around a British diplomat in Nairobi whose wife is murdered in northern Kenya. Much of the filming was in the Kibera slum.

Among the latest Kenyan actors in Hollywood who identify with Nairobi is Lupita Nyong'o. Lupita received an Oscar award for best supporting actress in her role as Patsy in the film 12 Years a Slave during the 86th Academy Awards at the Dolby theatre in Los Angeles. Lupita is the daughter of Kenyan politician Peter Anyang' Nyong'o.

Most new Hollywood films are nowadays screened at Nairobi's cinemas. Up until the early 1990s, there were only a few film theatres and the repertoire was limited. There are also two drive-in cinemas in Nairobi.

In 2015 and 2016, Nairobi was the focus point for the American television series Sense8 which shot its first and second seasons partly in the city. The TV series has high reviews in The Internet Movie Database (IMDB).

In 2015 Nairobi was also featured in the British thriller film Eye in the Sky, which is a story about a lieutenant general and a colonel who faced political opposition after ordering a drone missile strike to take out a group of suicide bombers in Nairobi.

In 2017, the name "Nairobi" was taken as a code-name by a female main character in the famous Spanish TV series Money Heist.

Food
In Nairobi, there are a range of restaurants. Besides being home to nyama choma which is a local term used to refer to roasted meat, there are American fast food restaurants such as KFC, Subway, Domino's Pizza, Pizza Hut, Hardee's and Burger King, and the longer established South African chains, Galitos, Steers, PizzaMojo, and Spur Steak Ranches. Coffee houses, doubling up as restaurants and mostly frequented by the upper middle classes, such as Artcaffe Nairobi Java House and Dormans, have become increasingly popular in recent days. Traditional food joints such as the popular K'osewe's in the city centre and Amaica, which specialize in African delicacies, are also widespread. The Kenchic franchise which specialized in old-school chicken and chips meals was also popular, particularly among the lower classes and students, with restaurants all over the city and its suburbs. However, as of February 2016, Kenchic stopped operating its eatery business. Upscale restaurants often specialize in specific cuisines such as Italian, Lebanese, Ethiopian, and French, but are more likely to be found in five star hotels and the wealthier suburbs in the West and South of the city.

Nairobi has an annual restaurant week (NRW) at the beginning of the year, January–February. Nairobi's restaurants offer dining packages at reduced prices. NRW is managed by Eatout Kenya which is an online platform that lists and reviews restaurants in Nairobi, and provides a platform for Kenyan foodies to congregate and share.

Music

Nairobi is the centre of Kenya's music scene. Benga is a Kenyan genre which was developed in Nairobi. The style is a fusion of jazz and Luo music forms. Mugithi is another popular genre in Kenya, with its origins in the central parts of the country. A majority of music videos of leading local musicians are also filmed in the city.

In the 1970s, Nairobi became the prominent centre for music in the African Great Lakes. During this period, Nairobi was established as a hub of soukous music. This genre was originally developed in Kinshasa and Brazzaville. After the political climate in the region deteriorated, many Congolese artists relocated to Nairobi. Artists such as Orchestra Super Mazembe moved from Congo to Nairobi and found great success. Virgin records became aware of the popularity of the genre and signed recording contracts with several soukous artists.

More recently, Nairobi has become the centre of the Kenyan hip hop scene, with Kalamashaka, Gidi Gidi Majimaji being the pioneers of urban music in Kenya. The genre has become very popular amongst local youth, and domestic musicians have become some of the most popular in the region. Successful artists based in Nairobi include Jua Cali, Nonini, Camp Mulla, Juliani, Eric Wainaina, Suzanna Owinyo and Nameless. Popular record labels include Ogopa DJs, Grand Pa Records, Main Switch, Red Black and Green Republik, Calif Records and Bornblack Music Group.

Many foreign musicians who tour Africa perform in Nairobi. Bob Marley's first-ever visit to Africa started in Nairobi. Acts that have performed in Nairobi include Lost Boyz, Wyclef Jean, Shaggy, Akon, Eve, T.O.K, Sean Paul, Wayne Wonder, Alaine, Konshens, Ja Rule, and Morgan Heritage, and Cabo Snoop. Other international musicians who have performed in Nairobi include the rocking show by Don Carlos, Demarco, Busy Signal, Mr. Vegas and the Elephant man crew.

Nairobi, including the coastal towns of Mombasa and Diani, have recently become the centre of EDM in Kenya, producing DJs as well as producers like Jack Rooster, Euggy, DJ Fita, Noise on Demand, DJ Vidza, DJ Coco EM. Prominent international composers and DJs have also toured in Nairobi, including Diplo, Major Lazer, Kyau & Albert, Solarity, Ronski Speed, and Boom Jinx.

Many nightclubs in and around the city have witnessed a growth in the population that exclusively listen to Electronic Dance Music, especially amongst the younger generations. These youth also support many local EDM producers and DJs, such as Jahawi, Mikhail Kuzi, Barney Barrow, Jack Rooster, HennessyLive, Trancephilic5 As well as up and comers such as L.A Dave, Eric K, Raj El Rey, Tom Parker and more.

Gospel music is also very popular in Nairobi just as in the rest of Kenya, with gospel artistes having a great impact in the mostly Christian city. Artistes such as Esther Wahome, Eunice Njeri, Daddy Owen, Emmy Kosgei and the late Angela Chibalonza, among others, have a great pull over the general population while others like MOG, Juliani, Ecko dyda, DK Kwenye Beat have great influence over the younger generation. Their concerts are also very popular and they have as much influence as the great secular artistes. The most popular are Groove tours, TSO (Totally Sold Out) new year concerts.

Musical group Sauti Sol performed for U.S. President Barack Obama when he was in the city for the 2015 Global Entrepreneurship Summit.

Sport

Nairobi is the African Great Lakes region's sporting centre. The premier sports facility in Nairobi and generally in Kenya is the Moi International Sports Centre in the suburb of Kasarani. The complex was completed in 1987, and was used to host the 1987 All Africa Games. The complex comprises a 60,000 seater stadium, the second largest in the African Great Lakes (after Tanzania's new national stadium), a 5,000 seater gymnasium, and a 2,000 seater aquatics centre.

The Nyayo National Stadium is Nairobi's second largest stadium renowned for hosting global rugby event under the "Safaricom Sevens." Completed in 1983, the stadium has a capacity of 30,000. This stadium is primarily used for football. The facility is located close to the Central Business District, which makes it a convenient location for political gatherings.

Nairobi City Stadium is the city's first stadium, and used for club football. Nairobi Gymkhana is the home of the Kenyan cricket team, and was a venue for the 2003 Cricket World Cup. Notable annual events staged in Nairobi include Safari Rally, Safari Sevens rugby union tournament, and Nairobi Marathon.

Football is the most popular sport in the city by viewership and participation. This is highlighted by the number of football clubs in the city, including Kenyan Premier League sides Gor Mahia, A.F.C. Leopards, Tusker and Mathare United.

There are six golf courses within a 20 km radius of Nairobi. The oldest 18-hole golf course in the city is the Royal Nairobi Golf Club. It was established in 1906 by the British, just seven years after the city was founded. Other notable golf clubs include the Windsor Country Club, Karen Country Club, and Muthaiga Golf Club. The Kenya Open golf tournament, which is part of the European Tour, takes place in Nairobi. The Ngong Racecourse in Nairobi is the centre of horse racing in Kenya.

Rugby is also a popular sport in Nairobi with 8 of the 12 top flight clubs based here.

Basketball is also a popular sport played in the city's primary, Secondary and college leagues. Many of the city's urban youth are basketball fans and watch the American NBA.

Places of worship 

The places of worship are predominantly Christian churches and temples: Roman Catholic Archdiocese of Nairobi (Catholic Church), Anglican Church of Kenya (Anglican Communion), Presbyterian Church of East Africa (World Communion of Reformed Churches), Baptist Convention of Kenya (Baptist World Alliance),and Assemblies of God. There are also Muslim mosques including Jamia Mosque.

Education
The majority of schools follow either the Kenyan Curriculum or the British Curriculum. There is also International School of Kenya, and Rosslyn Academy, both of which follow the North American Curriculum, Swedish school in N'gong, and the German school in Gigiri.

Higher education

Nairobi is home to several Universities and Colleges.
 The University of Nairobi is the largest and oldest university in Kenya. It was established in 1956, as part of the University of East Africa, but became an independent university in 1970. The university has approximately 84,000 students.
South Eastern Kenya University located in Kitui County is a fully fledged University and is the successor to the South Eastern University College (SEUCO) which was a Constituent College of the University of Nairobi.
The university was chartered in 1985, offering mainly education-related courses, but has since diversified, offering medicine, environmental studies, engineering, law, business, statistics, agriculture, and economics. It has a student body of about 32,000, the bulk of whom (17,000) are in the main campus. It is one of the fastest-growing public universities.
Strathmore University started in 1961 as an Advanced Level (UK) Sixth Form College offering Science and Arts subjects. The college started to admit accountancy students in March 1966, and thus became a university. In January 1993, Strathmore College merged with Kianda College and moved to Ole Sangale Road, Madaraka Estate, Nairobi.
 United States International University – Nairobi was originally a branch of the United States International University, but became a fully autonomous university in 2005. It was first established in 1969. The university has accreditation from the Western Association of Schools and Colleges, in the US, and the Government of Kenya. It is located in a quiet west side location of Roysambu area north-central Nairobi opposite the Safari Park Hotel.
 In 2005, The Aga Khan Hospital, Nairobi was upgraded to a health sciences teaching hospital, providing post graduate education in medicine and surgery including nursing education, henceforth renamed the Aga Khan University Hospital.
 The Catholic University of Eastern Africa located in Langata suburb, obtained its "Letter of Interim Authority" in 1989. Following negotiations between the Authority of the Graduate School of Theology and the Commission for Higher Education (CHIEA), the Faculty of Arts and Social Sciences was established three years later, culminating in the granting of the Civil Charter to CHIEA on 3 November 1992.
 The Technical University of Kenya (formerly Kenya Polytechnic) is the only Technical University in the country. Established in 1961 as the Kenya Technical Institute, the university was chartered by Mwai Kibaki in 2013 to become an independent institution of higher learning (It was previously a constituent college of the University of Nairobi). It offers highly technical degree courses in three faculties: Engineering and Built Environment, Applied Sciences and Technologies, and Social Sciences and Technologies.
 KCA University (formerly the Kenya College of Accountancy), located in Ruaraka.
 The Presbyterian University of East Africa (PUEA) is also another Institution of higher learning that is located in the town. It has several campuses around the town.

 Pan African Christian University is located along Lumumba Drive, Roysambu.
 East Africa Institute of Certified Studies (well known as ICS College) is located at Stanbank House with branches in Mombasa and Kisumu.
 Compugoal College
Pioneer International University in Ngara.
 Riara University on Mbagathi road.
 Umma University is the first Islamic Institution of higher education in Kenya. The main campus is located in Kajiado County. Other branches are located in Thika-Makongeni off Garissa road and Nairobi's Central Business District at Jamia Towers.
Multimedia University of Kenya

Numerous other universities have also opened satellite campuses in Nairobi. The Railways Training Institute established in 1956, is also a notable institution of higher learning with a campus in Nairobi.

Infrastructure

Transport

Major plans are being implemented in the need to decongest the city's traffic and the completion of Thika Road has given the city a much needed face-lift attributed to road's enhancement of global standards. Several projects have been completed (Syokimau Rail Station, the Eastern and Northern Bypasses) while numerous other projects are still underway.

The development of these critical transport facilities will, besides reducing transport costs due to faster movement of goods and people within the region, also increase trade, improve the socio-economic welfare of Northern Kenya and boost the country's potential in attracting investments from all over the world.

Airports

Jomo Kenyatta International Airport is the largest airport in Kenya. Domestic travelers made up 40% of overall passengers in 2016. An increase of 32% in 5 yrs since 2012. JKIA had more than 7 million passengers going through it in 2016. In February 2017, JKIA received a Category One Status from the FAA boosting the airport's status as a Regional Aviation hub.

Wilson Airport is a general-aviation airport handling smaller aircraft, mostly propeller-driven. In July 2016, construction of a new air traffic control Tower commenced at a cost of KES 163 million (approximately US$1.63 million).

Moi Air Base is a military airport. In its earlier years, it was utilised as a landing strip in the pre-jet airline era. It was mostly used as a British passenger and mail route from Southampton to Cape Town in the 1930s & 1940s. This route was served by flying boats between Britain and Kisumu and then by land-based aircraft on the routes to the south.

Matatu

Matatus are the most common form of public transport in Nairobi.
Matatu, which literally translates to "three cents for a ride" (nowadays much more) are privately owned minibuses, and the most popular form of local transport. They generally seat fourteen to thirty three. Matatus operate within Nairobi, its environs and suburbs and from Nairobi to other towns around the country. The matatu's route is imprinted along a yellow stripe on the side of the bus, and matatus plying specific routes have specific route numbers. However, in November 2014 President Uhuru Kenyatta lifted the ban on the yellow stripe and allowed matatus to maintain the colourful graphics in an effort to support the youth in creating employment. Matatus in Nairobi were easily distinguishable by their extravagant paint schemes, as owners would paint their matatu with various colourful decorations, such as their favourite football team or hip hop artist. They are notorious for their poor safety records, which are a result of overcrowding and reckless driving.  Due to the intense competition between matatus, many are equipped with powerful sound systems and television screens to attract more customers.

However, in 2004, a law was passed requiring all matatus to include seat belts and speed governors and to be painted with a yellow stripe. At first, this caused a furore amongst Matatu operators, but they were pressured by government and the public to make the changes.

Buses

Buses are increasingly becoming common in the city with some even going to the extents of installing complimentary WiFi systems in partnership with the leading mobile service provider. There are four major bus companies operating the city routes and are the traditional Kenya Bus Service (KBS), and newer private operators Citi Hoppa, Compliant MOA and Double M. The Citi Hoppa buses are distinguishable by their green livery, the Double M buses are painted purple, Compliant MOA by their distinctively screaming names and mix of white, blue colours while the KBS buses are painted blue.

Companies such as Easy Coach, Crown Bus, Coast Bus, Modern Coast, Eldoret Express, Chania, the Guardian Angel, Spanish and Mash Poa run scheduled buses and luxury coaches to other cities and towns.

A Bus rapid transit will commence operating with 100 high capacity buses along Thika Road in July 2022 between Kasarani and the Kenyatta National Hospital. After the pilot, Nairobi Metropolitan Area Transport Authority (Namata) will implement another 300 buses as the first phase that will expand the BRT line to run from Ruiru to Kenyatta National Hospital. A second phase will later extend the line to run between Kenol in Murang'a County to Ongata Rongai in Kajiado County.

Trains

Nairobi was founded as a railway town, and the main headquarters of Kenya Railways (KR) is still situated at Nairobi railway station, which is located near the city centre. The line runs through Nairobi, from Mombasa to Kampala. Its main use is freight traffic connecting Nairobi to Mombasa and Kisumu. A number of morning and evening commuter trains connect the centre with the suburbs, but the city has no proper light rail, tramway, or rapid transit lines. A proposal has been passed for the construction of a commuter rail line. The country's third president since independence, President Mwai Kibaki on Tuesday, 13 November 2012 launched the Syokimau Rail Service marking a major milestone in the history of railway development in the country. The opening of the station marked another milestone in efforts to realise various projects envisaged under the Vision 2030 Economic Blueprint. The new station has a train that ferries passengers from Syokimau to the city centre cutting travel time by half. Opening of the station marks the completion of the first phase of the Sh24b Nairobi Commuter Rail Network that is geared at easing traffic congestion in Nairobi, blamed for huge economic losses. Other modern stations include Imara Daima Railway Station and Makadara Railway Station.

The new Mombasa–Nairobi Standard Gauge Railway connects the port city of Mombasa and Nairobi. The new railway line has virtually replaced the old metre-gauge railway. The Nairobi Terminus is located at Syokimau, some 20 km from the city centre. Passengers travelling from Mombasa are transferred the short distance into the CBD with the metre-gauge trains.

Roads

Nairobi is served by highways that link Mombasa to Kampala in Uganda and Arusha in Tanzania. These are earmarked to ease the daily motor traffic within and surrounding the metro area. However, driving in Nairobi is chaotic. Most of the roads are tarmacked and there are signs showing directions to certain neighbourhoods. The city is connected to the Jomo Kenyatta International Airport by the Mombasa Highway, which passes through Industrial Area, South B, South C and Embakasi. Ongata Rongai, Langata and Karen are connected to the city centre by Langata Road, which runs to the south. Lavington, Riverside, and Westlands are connected by Waiyaki Way. Kasarani, Eastlands, and Embakasi are connected by Thika Road, Jogoo Road, and Outer Ring Road.

Highways connect the city with other major towns such as Mombasa, Machakos, Voi, (A109), Eldoret, Kisumu, Nakuru, Naivasha, and Namanga Border Tanzania (A104).

Nairobi is undergoing major road constructions to update its infrastructure network. The new system of roads, flyovers, and bridges are intended to better cope with high traffic levels. It is also a major component of Kenya's Vision 2030 and Nairobi Metropolis plans. Most roads now are well lit and surfaced with adequate signage.

In 2020, the construction of The Nairobi Expressway began.The Nairobi expressway is a 27 km toll road connecting the Eastern Nairobi neighbourhood of Mulolongo to the uptown neighbourhood of Westlands at James Gichuru junction through Nairobi CBD. The road is directly to the Jomo Kenyatta International Airport enabling travellers to access the airport faster avoiding the heavy traffic on Mombasa Road and Waiyaki Way. The road has an 11.025 km elevated section between Airtel Center and Westlands. 

This road, is intended to ease traffic from Jomo Kenyatta International Airport that accesses Nairobi city center. Also traffic from Central Nairobi is expected to be facilitated, to reduce the number of departing passengers who miss their fights, while stuck in road traffic jams on the city streets.[5] The work involves expansion of the existing road to four-lanes one-way, (8 lanes total), with foot paths, drainage channels, overpass bridges and street lighting. It was opened to the public in May 2022.

Private car population projection for Nairobi

Water supply and sanitation

94% of the piped water supply for Nairobi comes from rivers and reservoirs in the Aberdare Range north of the city, of which the reservoir of the Thika Dam is the most important one. Water distribution losses – technically called non-revenue water – are 40%, and only 40% of those with house connections receive water continuously. Slum residents receive water through water kiosks and end up paying much higher water prices than those fortunate enough to have access to piped water at their residence.

Housing

There is a wide variety of housing options in Nairobi. The options range from privately owned housing units/apartments, rented units, leased spaces and even houses on mortgage. Most wealthy Kenyans live in Nairobi, but the majority of Nairobians are of average and low income. Half of the population has been estimated to live in slums which cover just 5% of the city area. The growth of these slums is a result of urbanisation, poor town planning, lack of good governance and proper leadership in these settlements and lack of empowerment and social capital among other factors.

Kibera is one of the largest slums in Africa, and is situated to the west of Nairobi. (Kibera comes from the Nubian word Kibra, meaning "forest" or "jungle"). The slums cover two square kilometres and are on government land. Kibera has been the setting for several films, the most recent being The Constant Gardener.

Other notable slums include Mathare and Korogocho. Altogether, 66 areas are counted as slums within Nairobi.

Many Nairobi non-slum-dwellers live in relatively good housing conditions. Large houses can be found in many of the upmarket neighbourhoods, especially to the west of Nairobi. Historically, British occupiers have settled in Gigiri, Muthaiga, Langata and Karen. Other middle and high income estates include Parklands, Westlands, Hurlingham, Kilimani, Milimani, Spring Valley, Lavington, Rosslyn, Kitisuru, and Nairobi Hill.

To accommodate the growing middle class, many new apartments and housing developments are being built in and around the city. The most notable development is Greenpark, at Athi River, Machakos County  from Nairobi's Central Business District. Over 5,000 houses, villas and apartments are being constructed at this development, including leisure, retail and commercial facilities. The development is being marketed to families, as are most others within the city. Eastlands also houses most of the city's middle class and includes South C, South B, Embakasi, Buru Buru, Komarock, Donholm, Umoja, and various others.

Crime and law enforcement

Throughout the 2000s, Nairobi had struggled with rising crime, earning a reputation for being a dangerous city and the nickname "Nairobbery," a name which persists today. On 7 August 1998, the US Embassy was bombed, killing 224 people and injuring 4000. In 2001, the United Nations International Civil Service Commission rated Nairobi as among the most insecure cities in the world, classifying the city as "status C". In the United Nations report; it was stated that in 2001, nearly one third of all Nairobi residents experienced some form of robbery in the city. The head of one development agency cited the notoriously high levels of violent armed robberies, burglaries, and carjackings. Crime had risen in Nairobi as a result of unplanned urbanisation, with a minimal number of police stations and a proper security infrastructure. However, many claim that the biggest factor for the city's alarming crime rate is police corruption, which leaves many criminals unpunished. As a security precaution, most large houses have a watch guard, burglar grills, and dogs to patrol their grounds during the night. Most crimes, however, occur around the poor neighbourhoods where it gets dangerous during night hours.

In 2006, crime decreased in the city, due to increased security and an improved police presence. Despite this, in 2007, the Kenyan government and US State Department announced that Nairobi experienced a greater level of violent crime than in previous years. Since then, the government has taken measures to combat crime with heavy police presence in and around the city while US government has updated its travel warning for the country.

Following a grenade attack in October 2011 by a local Kenyan man, with terrorist links, the city faced a heightened security presence. Fears spread over further promised retaliations by the al-Shabaab group of rebels over Kenya's involvement in a coordinated operation with the Somalian military against the insurgent outfit.

There have been a spate of blasts in Nairobi which started on 10 March 2012, where assailants threw grenades at a busy bus station and a blue-collar bar in Nairobi, killing nine and injuring more than 50. On 28 May 2012, 28 people were injured in an explosion in a shopping complex in downtown Nairobi, near Moi Avenue. On 21 September 2013, al-Shabaab-associated militants attacked the Westgate Mall. 67 people were killed.

On January 15, 2019, five gunmen attacked the DusitD2 hotel in Nairobi's Westlands neighbourhood. The attack began with a suicide bomber in the hotel lobby, and was followed by gunfire. Terror group al-Shabaab claimed responsibility for the attack that killed 21 people. The attack was unexpected, because the area that it took place in is generally understood to be a very safe area. Citizens of many countries were inside the hotel due to Nairobi being East Africa's economic hub.

Media

Nairobi is home to most of Kenya's news and media organisations. The city is also home to the region's largest newspapers: the Daily Nation and The Standard. These are circulated within Kenya and cover a range of domestic and regional issues. Both newspapers are published in English. People Daily is also the leading free newspaper distributed on the streets of Nairobi. It is published by Mediamax Limited.

Kenya Broadcasting Corporation, a state-run television and radio station, is headquartered in the city. Kenya Television Network is part of the Standard Group and was Kenya's first privately-owned TV station. The Nation Media Group runs NTV which is based in Nairobi, The Royal Media Services (RMS). There are also a number of prominent radio stations located in Kenya's capital including Citizen radio, Inooro fm,KISS 100, Capital FM, East FM, Kameme FM, Metro FM, and Family FM, among others.

Several multinational media organisations have their regional headquarters in Nairobi. These include the BBC, CNN, Agence France-Presse, Reuters, Deutsche Welle, and the Associated Press. The East African bureau of CNBC Africa is located in Nairobi's city centre, while the Nairobi bureau of The New York Times is located in the suburb of Gigiri. The broadcast headquarters of CCTV Africa are located in Nairobi.

Notable people 
 

 Ishmael Awange (born 1989), Kenyan basketball player
 Chris Froome Born in Nairobi, Professional cyclist 4x Tour de France Winner
 Dorothy Ooko, Kenyan activist and technology professional
 Aaron Rimbui (born 1979), pianist, keyboardist, bandleader, producer, festival curator and radio host

Pop Culture 
Rise and Fall of Idi Amin, also referred to as, Amin: The Rise and Fall, is a 1981 biographical film by Sharad Patel. The movie details the controversial actions and atrocities of the once dictator of Uganda, Idi Amin Dada, in the time of his violent rise to power in 1971 until he descends in 1979 as the result of Uganda–Tanzania uprising. The movie depicts some of the roles Nairobi as the political hub of Kenya served in opposing the Ugandan dictator, including the coordination between Tel Aviv and Nairobi during operation Entebe.

In 2012, a Kenyan drama film directed by David "Tosh" Gitonga named Nairobi Half Life came to the big screen. The film was selected as the Kenyan entry for the Best Foreign Language Oscar at the 85th Academy Awards, but did not make the final shortlist, and is the first time Kenya has submitted a film in this category.

Nairobi city inspired the nicknaming of the character Ágata Jiménez as 'Nairobi'; a fictional character in the Netflix series Money Heist, portrayed by Alba Flores. She serves as the quality manager of the group, in charge of printing money in the Royal Mint of Spain in parts 1 and 2, and overseeing the melting of gold in the Bank of Spain in parts 3 and 4. She is widely considered to be the show's most popular character.

The future of Nairobi
Nairobi has grown since 1899. A population projection in the 21st century is listed below.

Nairobi metropolitan region

Nairobi is found within the Greater Nairobi Metropolitan region, which consists of 5 out of 47 counties in Kenya, which generate about 40% of the entire nation's GDP as per 2022 data by the Kenya National Bureau of Statistics. Nairobi County on its own contributes to 27.5% of the country's GDP according to the same report while Kiambu county comes second with 5.9%.
The counties are:

Twin towns – sister cities

Nairobi is twinned with:

 Addis Ababa, Ethiopia
 Denver, United States
 Kunming, China
 Lowell, United States
 Raleigh, United States
 São Luís, Brazil

Gallery

Explanatory notes

References

External links

 
County capitals in Kenya
Capitals in Africa
Populated places established in 1899
Provinces of Kenya
Populated places in Nairobi Province
1899 establishments in Africa